Pseudolithoxus anthrax is a species of armored catfish endemic to Venezuela where it is found in the Orinoco River basin.  This species grows to a length of  SL.

References
 

Ancistrini
Fish of Venezuela
Endemic fauna of Venezuela
Fish described in 2000
Taxa named by Jonathan W. Armbruster